The Hauteville was a Norman family originally of seigneurial rank from the Cotentin. The Hautevilles rose to prominence through their part in the Norman conquest of southern Italy. By 1130, one of their members, Roger II, was made the first King of Sicily. His male-line descendants ruled Sicily until 1194. Some Italian Hautevilles took part in the First Crusade and the founding of the Principality of Antioch (1098).

Origins

The traditional account of the family's origin traces them back to Hiallt, a 10th-century Norseman who settled in the Cotentin Peninsula and founded the estate of Hialtus villa, giving rise in corrupted form to the family toponymic Hauteville. The name represents the Scandinavian Hjalti or Hialti), but may instead have resulted from confusion with the Helt[us] found in Heltvilla, modern Héauville.  Alternatively, the eponymous Hiallt may be legendary: Hauteville (Altavilla) means simply "high estate". Of several villages with the name "Hauteville", the one from which the family derived its name is hard to identify with certainty, though modern scholarship favours Hauteville-la-Guichard, but there is no proof that allows to connect the related knight Robert Guiscard with this village. Guiscard refers more probably to a Guichard de Montfort.

The first well-known member of the family is Tancred of Hauteville, a minor baron of Normandy who died about 1041. He had twelve sons and at least two daughters by two wives, Muriel and Fressenda. His small patrimony was hardly enough to satisfy his sons' desire for land and glory, and so eight of the twelve went south to the Mezzogiorno to seek their fortunes there.

According to Goffredo Malaterra's chronicle, Aubrey or Alverardus, the fourth son by Tancred's second wife, Fressenda, remained behind in Normandy. About the time of the Domesday Book in 1086 a certain Alverardus or Aluericus Hautville (Halsvilla, Altavilla or Hauteville) is mentioned as having previously held lands in Compton Martin, Somerset, England. His kinsman Ralf de Hauville (also Halsvilla) is mentioned in the Domesday Book of 1086 as a tenant-in-chief in Burbage and Wolfhall in Wiltshire. Alverardus most probably founded the Somerset Hautevilles, and Ralf the Wiltshire/Berkshire Hauvilles.

Mezzogiorno

The eldest of Tancred of Hauteville's twelve sons, William and Drogo, were the first to arrive in the south sometime around 1035. They so distinguished themselves against the Greeks that William was inaugurated as count of Apulia and Calabria and lord of Ascoli, Drogo as lord of Venosa. In 1047, Drogo was confirmed by the Emperor Henry III as William's heir and a direct vassal of the imperial crown. Their next brother, Humphrey, succeeded Drogo and defeated Pope Leo IX at the Battle of Civitate in 1053, making the Hauteville power the highest in the region. He was in turn succeeded by a fourth brother, the first by Tancred's second wife, Robert Guiscard.

It was Robert who began the conquest of Sicily which was to yield a kingdom seventy years later, as he renewed the war against Byzantium with vigour.  Along with the valiant warriorship displayed by his youngest brother, Roger Bosso, the two began to amass notoriety around the Mediterranean.  According to William of Apulia's The Deeds of Robert Guiscard, although his Norse roots would seem to suggest otherwise, until the invasion of Sicily, Guiscard had not participated in naval warfare.  It was during this conquest that Guiscard and his amphibious command pioneered the ability to transport over 200 troops in a mere 13 vessels, an advantage that would have an influence in the Norman invasion of England of 1066. In 1059 he was created duke by the pope and invested with as yet unconquered Sicily, which he gave, in 1071, to his brother Roger with the title of count. The Guiscard's heirs, Bohemond and Roger Borsa, fought over the inheritance and Roger of Sicily began to outshine the Apulian branch of the family. Roger united the Greek, Lombard, Norman, and Saracen elements of Sicily under one rule and refused to allow religious differences to spoil his conquests.

Roger bequeathed a powerful state to his young sons, Simon and Roger. It was this Roger who, upon inheriting all from Simon in 1105, began the quest to unite into one all the Hauteville domains: Apulia and Calabria (then under Borsa's son William II) and Taranto (which had been given to Bohemond as a consolation for being deprived of Apulia) with his own Sicily.

Kingdom of Sicily
On William's death in 1127, the union of the duchy and the county was affected and Roger's quest for a crown began. Believing kings to have ruled Palermo in antiquity, Roger threw his support behind the Antipope Anacletus II and was duly enthroned as king of Sicily on Christmas Day 1130.

Roger spent most of the decade beginning with his coronation and ending with his great Assizes of Ariano fending off one invader or other and quelling rebellions by his premier vassals: Grimoald of Bari, Robert of Capua, Ranulf of Alife, Sergius of Naples, et al. In 1139, by the Treaty of Mignano, Roger received the recognition of his kingship from the legitimate pope. It was through his admiral George of Antioch that Roger then proceeded to conquer the Mahdia in Africa, taking the unofficial title "king of Africa".

Roger's son and successor was William the Bad, though his nickname derives primarily from his lack of popularity with the chroniclers, who supported the baronial revolts William crushed. His reign ended in peace (1166), but his son, William the Good, was a minor. During the boy regency until 1172, the kingdom saw turmoil which almost brought the ruling family down, but eventually the realm settled down and the reign of the second William is remembered as two decades of almost continual peace and prosperity. For this more than anything, he is nicknamed "the Good". His death without heirs in 1189 threw the realm into chaos, as his designated and only legitimate heir, his aunt Constance, daughter of Roger II, had married Henry, son of Frederick I, Holy Roman Emperor, and the Sicilian officials did not want a German ruler.

Tancred of Lecce, illegitimate cousin of William, seized the throne but had to contend with the revolt of his distant cousin Roger of Andria, a former contender, and the invasion of Henry, now Henry VI of Germany, on behalf of his wife. Tancred was able to kill Roger in 1190; in 1191 he repelled an invasion of Henry in 1191 and captured Constance, but was forced to release her under pressure of Pope Celestine III. After his death in 1194, Constance and Henry eventually prevailed and the kingdom fell to the Hohenstaufen. Through Constance, however, the Hauteville blood was passed to the great Frederick II, Holy Roman Emperor.

Crusades
The aforementioned Bohemond received in 1088, as a consolation, the principality of Taranto district from the duchy of Apulia which fell as per their father's will to his brother Roger Borsa. Bohemond did not long remain to enjoy his new principality, for while besieging Amalfi with his uncle and brother, he joined a passing band of Crusaders on their way to Palestine. Among his army was a nephew of his, a young man named Tancred.

Bohemond was the natural leader of the crusading host but, through a trick, he took Antioch and did not continue on to Jerusalem with the rest of the army, instead remaining in the newly conquered city to carve out a principality for himself there. Tancred also left the main Crusade at Heraclea Cybistra to fight for territory in Cilicia. A great state like the one his cousins were forging in Europe, however, was impossible for Bohemond. He was defeated badly at the Battle of Harran in 1104 and forced later to sign the Treaty of Devol in 1108 with Byzantium. Nevertheless, his son Bohemond II inherited the Crusader state. He in turn gave it to his only daughter, Constance, who ruled it until 1163.

Tancred had great luck in carving out a principality around Galilee with the grants of Godfrey of Bouillon, but he relinquished this in 1101.

Genealogy
Unless otherwise noted, dates shown are regnal dates.

Tancred and his first wife Muriel (or Muriella) had the following issue:
William Iron Arm, count of Apulia (1042–1046)
Drogo, count of Apulia (1046–1051)
Humphrey, count of Apulia (1051–1057)
Abelard (d.1081)
Herman, count of Cannae (1081–1097)
Geoffrey, count of the Capitanate (d.1071)
Robert I, count of Loritello (1061–1107)
Robert II, count of Loritello (1107–1137)
William, count of Loritello (1137, d.?)
Sarlo (or Serlo) I, heir to estates in Normandy
Sarlo II (d.1072) married the daughter of Roger de Moulins Count of Boiano.
Sarlo III descending from which the Marquis Sarlo of Calabria
Tancred and his second wife Fressenda (or Fedesenda) had the following issue:
Robert Guiscard, count (1057–1059) and duke of Apulia (1059–1085)
Bohemond I, prince of Taranto (1088–1111) and Antioch (1098–1111)
Bohemond II, prince of Taranto (1111–1128) and Antioch (1111–1131)
Constance, Princess of Antioch (1131–1163)
Roger Borsa, duke of Apulia (1085–1111)
William II, duke of Apulia (1111–1127)
Guy, duke of Amalfi and Sorrento (d.1107)
Robert Scalio (d.1110)
Emma of Apulia
Tancred, Prince of Galilee (1072–1112)
William
Mauger, count of the Capitanate (1056–1059)
William, count of the Principate (1056–1080)
Richard of Salerno, regent of the County of Edessa (1104–1108, d.1114)
Roger of Salerno, regent of the Principality of Antioch (1112–1119)
Aubrey (also Alberic, Alberad, Alvered, Alvred, or Alfred), stayed in Normandy
Hubert (also Humbert), stayed in Normandy
Tancred, stayed in Normandy
Roger Bosso, count of Sicily (1071–1101)
Jordan, count of Syracuse (1091–1092)
Geoffrey, count of Ragusa
Mauger, count of Troina
Simon, count of Sicily (1101–1105)
Roger II, count (1105–1130) and king of Sicily (1130–1154)
Roger, duke of Apulia (1134–1148)
Tancred, count of Lecce and king of Sicily (1189–1194)
Roger III, king of Sicily (1193–1194)
William III, king of Sicily (1194)
Tancred, prince of Bari (1132–1138)
Alfonso, prince of Capua (1135–1144)
William I the Bad, king of Sicily (1154–1166)
Roger, duke of Apulia (1154–1161)
Robert
William II the Good, king of Sicily (1166–1189)
Bohemond, duke of Apulia (1181)
Henry, prince of Capua (1166–1172)
Henry
Simon, Prince of Taranto (1128–1154)
Constance, Queen of Sicily (1194–1198)
Frederick II of Sicily, King of Sicily (1198–1250)
Fressenda, who married Richard I (dead in 1078), count of Aversa and prince of Capua
Jordan I of Capua, Prince of Capua (1078–1091)
Richard II of Capua, Prince of Capua (1091–1106)
Robert I of Capua, Prince of Capua (1106–1120)
Richard III of Capua, Prince of Capua (1120)
Jordan II of Capua, Prince of Capua (1120–1127)
Robert II of Capua, Prince of Capua (1127–1156)

Relatives of unknown relationship include:
Tancred, count of Syracuse (fl. 1104)
Simon, count of Syracuse (fl. 1162), possibly a son of Roger II or nephew of Roger I.

References

Sources
European Commission presentation of The Normans Norman Heritage, 10th-12th century.
Norwich, John Julius. The Normans in the South 1016-1130. Longmans: London, 1967.
Norwich, John Julius. The Kingdom in the Sun 1130-1194. Longman: London, 1970.
Pierre Aubé, Roger II de Sicile. 2001.
Matthew, Donald. The Norman Kingdom of Sicily. Cambridge University Press: 1992.
Houben, Hubert. Roger II of Sicily: A Ruler between East and West. Trans. G. A. Loud and Diane Milbourne. Cambridge University Press: 2002.
Medieval Sourcebook: Alexiad—complete text, translated Elizabeth A. Dawes
Ralph of Caen. Gesta Tancredi. trans. Bernard S. and David S. Bachrach. Ashgate Publishing, 2005.

 
 
Italo-Norman families